The 48 national teams were divided into ten groups (two groups of four + eight groups of 5). Each group winner, as well as the six highest ranked second placed teams, advanced to the play-off. One of the eight qualifiers was then chosen to host the remaining fixtures.

Qualifying group stage

Draw
The allocation of teams into qualifying groups was based on that of UEFA Euro 2004 qualifying tournament with several changes, reflecting the absence of some nations:
 Groups 1, 2, 3, 4, 6, 9 and 10 featured the same nations
 Group 5 did not include Faroe Islands
 Group 7 did not include Liechtenstein, but included Portugal (who did not participate in senior Euro qualification)
 Group 8 did not include Andorra

Group 1

Group 2

Group 3

Group 4

Group 5

Group 6

Group 7

Group 8

Group 9

Group 10

Ranking of second-placed teams
Because some groups contained five teams and some four, matches against the fifth-placed team in each group are not included in the ranking. As a result, six matches played by each team counted for the purposes of the second-placed table. The top six advanced to the play-off.

Play-offs

|}

External links 
 Results Archive at uefa.com
 RSSSF Results Archive ''at rsssf.com

 
2004 UEFA European Under-21 Championship
Qual
UEFA European Under-21 Championship qualification